UDP-GlcNAc:betaGal beta-1,3-N-acetylglucosaminyltransferase 7 is a protein in humans that is encoded by the B3GNT7 gene.

References

Further reading 

Genes on human chromosome 2